Kincaid Lake is a  artificial lake in Pendleton County, Kentucky. It was created in 1961 by impounding Kincaid Creek, a branch of the Licking River. It is the primary attraction of Kincaid Lake State Park.

See also
Kincaid Lake State Park

References

Infrastructure completed in 1961
Reservoirs in Kentucky
Protected areas of Pendleton County, Kentucky
Bodies of water of Pendleton County, Kentucky
Licking River (Kentucky)